Al-Dirbashiyya was a Palestinian Arab village in the Safad Subdistrict. It was depopulated during the 1947–1948 Civil War in Mandatory Palestine on May 10, 1948, by the Palmach's First Battalion of Operation Yiftach. It was located 20 km northeast of Safad in the Hula Valley, bordering Hula Lake.

Location
The village was located on the lower slopes of the Golan Heights near the border with Syria overlooking the Hula Valley. The lands to the west of the village were mainly marshland, although there were a few palm trees, and wooded areas to the south. 
A shrine named after a Muslim sage, named al-Samadi, was located between the village and Hula Lake.

History
The Palestine Index Gazetteer classified the village as a hamlet  and during the British Mandate the British built a police station. 

The inhabitants mainly earned their living from  the cultivation of vegetables. 

In the 1945 statistics  Ed Darbashiya had a population of 310 Muslims, with a total of 2,883 dunam of land. Of this, they used 2,763 dunums for plantations and irrigable land,  while 120 dunams were classified as non-uncultivable land.

Post 1948
In 1992 the village site was described: "The rubble of destroyed houses is scattered across the village site. The site also contains a segment of a cement-lined irrigation canal, and the remains of terraces in some fields. The village lands, which are used mainly as pastures, are covered with grass, cactus plants, and Christ’s-thorn and eucalyptus trees."

References

Bibliography

External links
Welcome To al-Dirbashiyya
al-Dirbashiyya, Zochrot
al-Dirbashiyya,  Villages of Palestine

Arab villages depopulated during the 1948 Arab–Israeli War
District of Safad